Bradu River may refer to the following rivers in Romania:

Brad, a tributary of the Baraolt in Covasna County
Brad, a tributary of the Olt in Sibiu County
Bradu, a tributary of the Priboiasa in Vâlcea County
Brad, a tributary of the Răstolița in Mureș County

See also 
 Brad (disambiguation)
 Brădetul River (disambiguation)
 Brădișor River
 Bradu, the name of three villages in Romania